is a Japanese pair skater. With his partner Haruna Murakami, he is the 2022 JGP Poland I bronze medalist and the 2022–23 Japan champion at both the senior and junior levels.

Personal life 
Moriguchi was born on 29 December 2001 in Uji, Kyoto, Japan.

Programs

With Murakami

Competitive highlights 
JGP: Junior Grand Prix

With Murakami for Japan

Men's singles

References

External links 
 

Japanese male pair skaters
Japanese male single skaters
Doshisha University alumni
Sportspeople from Kyoto
Living people
2001 births